The Legend of Captain Jack Sparrow was an immersive walk-through special effects attraction at Disney's Hollywood Studios theme park at Walt Disney World Resort. The attraction opened on December 6, 2012. It replaced the Journey into Narnia: Prince Caspian attraction that previously occupied the building.

Guests followed the story of Captain Jack Sparrow from the Pirates of the Caribbean film series and experience several interactive sequences. The Legend of Captain Jack Sparrow closed on November 6, 2014. The building that housed the attraction was demolished for the entrance to Toy Story Land.

Attraction
Guests were taken into an indoor theatre themed to a coastal cove, where they were recruited by a talking skull (voice of James Arnold Taylor) in hopes of becoming part of Captain Jack Sparrow's crew. During the training process, static skeletons are reanimated from the dead, Davy Jones' Kraken appears and mermaids attempt to coax guests by singing sea chants. The talking skull informs the guests that they are ready to partake in Sparrow's crew. Following his words, Jack Sparrow (Johnny Depp) appears via high-definition projection and engages in a battle with Davy Jones, entrusting the newly inducted crew to help. Sparrow manages to defeat Jones by sinking his ship; the Flying Dutchman. Sparrow congratulates the crew and invites them to a celebratory singing of "Yo Ho (A Pirate's Life for Me)". Finally, Sparrow bids the guests farewell and the show concludes.

See also
Pirates of the Caribbean

References

Amusement rides introduced in 2012
Animation Courtyard
Caribbean in fiction
Disney's Hollywood Studios
Piracy in fiction
Pirates of the Caribbean
Former Walt Disney Parks and Resorts attractions
Amusement rides that closed in 2014
Buildings and structures demolished in 2016
2012 establishments in Florida
2014 disestablishments in Florida